The Panche or Tolima is an indigenous group of people in what is now Colombia. Their language is unclassified – and possibly unclassifiable – but may have been Cariban. They inhabited the southwestern parts of the department of Cundinamarca and the northeastern areas of the department of Tolima, close to the Magdalena River. At the time of the Spanish conquest, more than 30,000 Panche were living in what would become the New Kingdom of Granada. Early knowledge about the Panche has been compiled by scholar Pedro Simón. According to the latter, the word panche in their own Panche language means "cruel" and "murderer".

Panche territory 

The Panche were inhabiting the lower altitude southwestern areas of the Cundinamarca department, close to the Magdalena River. Their northern neighbours were the Muzo in the northeast and the Pantágora in the northwest, in the east the Muisca, in the southeast the Sutagao and to the south and southwest the Pijao. The northern limits were defined by the Río Negro and the Guarinó River and the southern limits the Coello and Fusagasugá Rivers.

The Panche people were organized in a loose confederation with different subgroups whose names still remain as municipalities of Cundinamarca.

Municipalities belonging to Panche territories

Description 
The Panche were a strong group of warriors who fought numerous battles with the neighbouring Muisca. They walked partially naked and were ornamented with earrings, feathers and golden pieces.

The Panche hunted and fought wars with their enemies using sticks and clubs and poisoned arrows. They used poison of spiders and snakes for their arrows.

Petroglyphs of the Panche were discovered in Tibacuy, Viotá, El Colegio, Cachipay, Albán, Sasaima. Rock paintings have been found in Tibacuy.

Like other indigenous peoples of the Americas, such as the Guane, the Panche performed cranial deformation.

According to Pedro Simón, the Panche performed cannibalism on parts of their conquered enemies. Some sources state they ate everything except for the heads, which they hung in their bohíos. However, later research by various researchers has found no evidence for cannibalism and attribute the cannibalistic ideas to the Spanish conquistadores.

In terms of their burial practices the Panches differed from their neighbours that the dead were not oriented in a fixed position, like the Muisca with their heads to the east and the Muzo with their heads to the west.

History 

The Panche civilization has been described from 300 AD onwards. Around the year 1000 migrations from the Caribbean coast of Colombia happened inward.

After the Spanish conquest and the installation of the New Kingdom of Granada, the Panche quickly diminished due to their resistance against the Spanish conquistadores. The first Spanish conquerors who invaded the Panche territories were Juan de Céspedes and Alonso de San Martín. Later conquest was performed by Hernán Venegas Carrillo.

More than 2000 artefacts from the Panche are stored in the Museo del Oro in Bogotá.

1543-44 - Expedition Hernán Venegas Carrillo

See also 

Muisca
Muzo
Pijao, Sutagao
Colombian mythology
Indigenous peoples in Colombia

References

Bibliography 
 
 
 

Andean civilizations
Indigenous peoples in Colombia
Colombian culture
 
 
Unclassified languages of South America